Sima Marković (8 November 1888 in Kragujevac, Kingdom of Serbia – 19 April 1939 in Moscow, USSR) was a Serbian mathematician, communist and socialist politician and philosopher, known as one of the founders and first leaders of the Communist Party of Yugoslavia.

Marković was a doctor of mathematical sciences and a university professor. He has written many works in mathematics, philosophy, physics and politics.

He was an early activist and member of the Serbian Social Democratic Party in the Kingdom of Serbia, and since the unification of the Yugoslav communists in 1919 a member of the Communist Party of Yugoslavia.

He advocated the preservation and peaceful reform of Yugoslavia into the republic, as opposed to the then position of the Comintern. He was killed in Stalinist purges in 1939 along with many other leading Yugoslav communists. He was rehabilitated on 10 June 1958 by a decision of the Supreme Court of the Soviet Union.

References

Yugoslav communists
Executed Yugoslav people
Great Purge victims from Yugoslavia
Soviet rehabilitations
People granted political asylum in the Soviet Union
1888 births
1939 deaths
Executed communists